Dream Warrior Pictures is an Indian film production company based in Chennai. It was founded in 2010 by brothers S R Prakashbabu and S R Prabhu, who were partners in Studio Green during 2010–2013. They are also relatives of the veteran actor Sivakumar and cousins for actors Suriya and Karthi. They are prominent producers and distributors in India.

History 
Dream Warrior Pictures first produced the film Kaashmora (2016), which is the highest budget film in Karthi's career. Karthi, Nayanthara, Sri Divya, Vivek are the protagonists in Kaashmora. This film turned was a historic-horror-comedy flick (multi genre), directed by Gokul, whose previous film at that point was Idharkuthane Aasaipattai Balakumara. The music of Kaashmora was composed by Santhosh Narayanan. Kaashmora involves huge VFX work with CG footage amounting to close to 70 mins. Producers confirmed that Kaashmora was released both in Tamil and Telugu languages on Diwali 2016 (October).

Studio's next project was titled as Joker (2016), directed by Raju Murugan, whose previous was Cuckoo, Guru Somasundaram is the protagonist of the Joker movie. This movie emphasis the necessity of toilets for all rural homes. Even the Indian Prime Minister Narendra Modi has addressed this issue. Hence medias are asking Prime Minister to watch the film. In the movie, protagonist thinks himself as The President of India. Joker explores different side of me, says Guru Somasundaram. The Superstar of Indian Cinema Padma Vibhushan Rajnikanth praised the Joker team for making the movie. Joker won the Tamil Film competition of 14th Chennai International Film Festival held in January 2017 at Chennai. Also the film won couple more awards for Best Dialogues and Best Production which is conferred by Ananda Vikatan.

Simultaneously, the company had produced another movie titled Aruvi (2017), which is an Eco Social Drama, directed by Arun Prabhu Purushothaman. The Team had been hunting for lead artist through all social medias. Aruvi made its international premiere at Shanghai International Film Festival in June 2016. Producer S R Prabhu says, We are so much proud that Aruvi has become one of the best films produced under our banner. Alongside Aruvi , Kootathil Orthan (2017) had started which is directed by Gnanavel, his debut movie. Ashok Selvan and Priya Anand were playing the lead roles in this movie.

After Kaashmora, Aruvi and Kootathil Oruthan, the production house had been producing Karthi's movie  Theeran Adhigaaram Ondru  directed by H Vinoth. Also, Dream Warrior Pictures is eyeing for an International co-production for their project The Sunshine, which is written by Leena Manimekalai and Antonythasan Jesuthasan, to be directed by Leena Manimekalai. The Sunshine was presented in 2016 Film Bazaar co-production market. Release of Theeran Adhigaaram Ondru had happened in Nov 2017 which is then followed by producing the web series Vella Raja starring Bobby Simha and Parvati Nair. The streaming of Vella Raja had happened on Amazon Prime Video on Dec 2018. Then the making of Suriya's 36th movie NGK  had started in Feb 2018 and the release had happened in May 2019. Presently Maanagaram  fame Lokesh Kanagaraj's Kaithi (2019 film) was released on 25 October 2019, coinciding with Diwali. Which is continued with the making of Sharwanand and Ritu Varma starrer upcoming bilingual (Tamil & Telugu) film directed by debut director Shree Karthick for releasing during summer 2020.

Filmography

Films Produced

Films distributed

Web series 
Vella Raja (2018)

References

External links 
 Official Website www.DWP.in
 DWP in IMDB

Indian film studios
Film distributors of India
Film production companies based in Chennai
Entertainment companies established in 2010
2010 establishments in Tamil Nadu
Indian companies established in 2010